Trustmark is a commercial bank and financial services company headquartered in Jackson, Mississippi, United States, with subsidiaries Trustmark National Bank, Trustmark Investment Advisors, and Fisher Brown Bottrell Insurance. The bank's initial predecessor, The Jackson Bank, was chartered by the State of Mississippi in 1889. Through numerous acquisitions and name changes, the Trustmark brand began in 1971, and the bank now serves Mississippi, the Gulf coast of Alabama, the Florida Panhandle, some suburbs of Memphis, and Houston. In 2017, the bank was named the "best regional bank" in the South, by Kiplinger's, and named a "best-in-state" bank by Forbes in 2021.

Financial condition
, the bank had $17.36 billion in assets and $15.03 billion in deposits.

See also
List of banks
List of banks in United States

References

External links
Trustmark Bank site

Companies based in Jackson, Mississippi
Banks based in Mississippi
Banks established in 1889